Tornatellinops novoseelandica is a species of minute air-breathing land snail, a terrestrial pulmonate gastropod mollusk or micromollusk in the family Achatinellidae.

References

 Powell A. W. B., New Zealand Mollusca, William Collins Publishers Ltd, Auckland, New Zealand 1979 

novoseelandica
Gastropods of New Zealand
Gastropods described in 1853